Stipa tenacissima (esparto, esparto grass, halfah grass, alfa grass, or needle grass) is a perennial grass of northwestern Africa and the southern part of the Iberian Peninsula.

Distribution
Stipa tenacissima is an endemic species of the Western–Central Mediterranean countries. It grows in France (including Corsica), Spain (including the Baleares), Portugal, Morocco, Algeria, Tunisia and Libya. It grows in dry, rocky and base rich soils, forming a steppe-like grassland. It has been managed by people for centuries.

Uses

Stipa tenacissima produces a fiber product called esparto which is used for crafts, such as cords, basketry, and espadrilles as well as for making paper.

See also
Lygeum  spartum, another species of grass also used as esparto

References

External links
Stipa tenacissima Spanish information

tenacissima
Fiber plants
Bunchgrasses of Europe
Flora of Algeria
Flora of Morocco
Flora of Tunisia
Flora of Spain
Flora of Portugal
Flora of North Africa
Plants described in 1759
Taxa named by Carl Linnaeus
Flora of the Mediterranean Basin